November 24 - Eastern Orthodox liturgical calendar - November 26

All fixed commemorations below are observed on December 8 by Eastern Orthodox Churches on the Old Calendar.

For November 25, Orthodox Churches on the Old Calendar commemorate the Saints listed on November 12.

Feasts

 Apodosis of the Entry of the Most Holy Theotokos into the Temple.

Saints

 Hieromartyr Clement, Pope of Rome (101) (see also: November 24 - Greek)
 Great-martyr Mercurius of Caesarea in Cappadocia (259) (see also: November 24 - Russian)
 Great-martyr Catherine of Alexandria (305) (see also: November 24 - Russian)
 Holy 150 Orators, martyred by fire, with Great-martyr Catherine of Alexandria (305)
 Martyrs Augusta (Faustina) the Empress, by beheading, Porphyrius Stratelates and 200 soldiers at Alexandria, by the sword (305) (see also: November 24 - Russian)
 Holy 670 Martyrs, by the sword.
 Hieromartyr Peter, Archbishop of Alexandria (311) (see also: November 24 - Greek)
 Venerable Peter the Silent (the Hesychast), of Galatia and Antioch (c. 403 or 429) (see also: February 1)
 Saint Clement of Ohrid, Bishop of Ohrid (Achrida), Enlightener of Bulgaria and Wonderworker (916) (see also: November 22)

Pre-Schism Western saints

 Hieromartyr Moses, a priest in Rome, noted for his zeal in preaching the Gospel and his firm stand against Novatianism, martyred under Decius (251)
 Saint Jucunda, a holy virgin in Reggio in Aemilia in Italy and a spiritual daughter of St Prosper, Bishop of that city (466)
 Saint Alanus, Abbot and founder of Lavaur in Gascony in France (7th century)
 Saint Imma (Immina), born in Würzburg, she became abbess of a convent in Karlburg in Germany (c. 752)
 Saint Bernold, monk-priest of Ottobeuren Abbey in Bavaria in Germany, renowned as a wonderworker (c. 1050)

Post-Schism Orthodox saints

—

New martyrs and confessors

 Martyr Magdalena Zabelina (1931)
 New Hieromartyr Seraphim (Ostroumov), Archbishop of Smolensk (1937)
 New Hieromartyr Yaroslav Savitsky, Protopresbyter of Moscow (1937)
 New Hieromartyrs Hilarion Soloviev and Simeon Afonkin, Priests, of Alma Ata (1937)
 New Hieromartyr John Vladimirsky of Tver (1937) 
 New Hieromartyr Cosmas Korotkikh of Moscow (1937)
 New Hieromartyrs Gregory Voinov, Basil Pariysky, John Tarasov, Alexander Vershinsky, John Janushev, Victor Smirnov, Andrew Shershnev, Priests (1937)
 New Hieromartyr Varlaam Popov (1937)
 Martyr Paul Kuzovkov (1937) 
 Martyr Nicholas Kopninsky (1938)

Other commemorations
 
 Repose of priest Pavel Florensky of Sergiev Posad (1937)
 Repose of Protopriest Rostislav Gan in Australia (1975)

Icon gallery

Notes

References

Sources
 November 25 / December 8. Orthodox Calendar (PRAVOSLAVIE.RU).
 December 8 / November 25. Holy Trinity Russian Orthodox Church (A parish of the Patriarchate of Moscow).
 November 25. OCA - The Lives of the Saints.
 The Autonomous Orthodox Metropolia of Western Europe and the Americas (ROCOR). St. Hilarion Calendar of Saints for the year of our Lord 2004. St. Hilarion Press (Austin, TX). p. 88.
 The Twenty-Fifth Day of the Month of November. Orthodoxy in China.
 November 25. Latin Saints of the Orthodox Patriarchate of Rome.
 The Roman Martyrology. Transl. by the Archbishop of Baltimore. Last Edition, According to the Copy Printed at Rome in 1914. Revised Edition, with the Imprimatur of His Eminence Cardinal Gibbons. Baltimore: John Murphy Company, 1916. p. 363-364.
 Rev. Richard Stanton. A Menology of England and Wales, or, Brief Memorials of the Ancient British and English Saints Arranged According to the Calendar, Together with the Martyrs of the 16th and 17th Centuries. London: Burns & Oates, 1892. pp. 565–566.
Greek Sources
 Great Synaxaristes:  25 ΝΟΕΜΒΡΙΟΥ. ΜΕΓΑΣ ΣΥΝΑΞΑΡΙΣΤΗΣ.
  Συναξαριστής. 25 Νοεμβρίου. ECCLESIA.GR. (H ΕΚΚΛΗΣΙΑ ΤΗΣ ΕΛΛΑΔΟΣ). 
  25/11/2015. Ορθόδοξος Συναξαριστής. 
Russian Sources
  8 декабря (25 ноября). Православная Энциклопедия под редакцией Патриарха Московского и всея Руси Кирилла (электронная версия). (Orthodox Encyclopedia - Pravenc.ru).
  25 ноября по старому стилю / 8 декабря по новому стилю. Русская Православная Церковь - Православный церковный календарь на 2018 год.

November in the Eastern Orthodox calendar